Prafulla Chandra Sen Government Medical College and Hospital (PCSGMCH), established in 2022, is a full-fledged tertiary Government Medical college and hospital. It is located at Arambagh city in Hooghly district, West Bengal. The college imparts the degree of Bachelor of Medicine and Surgery (MBBS). The hospital associated with the college is one of the largest hospitals in the Hooghly district. Yearly undergraduate student intake is 100 from the year 2022.

Courses
Prafulla Chandra Sen Medical College and Hospital undertakes education and training of 100 students MBBS courses.

Affiliated
The college is affiliated with West Bengal University of Health Sciences and is recognized by the National Medical Commission.

References

Medical colleges in West Bengal
Universities and colleges in Hooghly district
Affiliates of West Bengal University of Health Sciences
Educational institutions established in 2022